Aaron Pervis Williams (born November 9, 1991) is an American professional basketball player that currently plays for Sangalhos DC of the LPB. Standing at 1.98 m (6'6), he plays at the guard and forward positions. After one year at Dodge City College and three years at Chicago State University he played professional basketball in the United States, Albania, Canada, Lebanon, Sweden, Ukraine and Portugal.

High school career 
Williams played high school basketball at Chicago Vocational Career Academy at Chicago, Illinois. He was a 2010 McDonalds All-American nominee and also earned all-Chicago Public League Red-South honors as a senior.

College career 
After graduating from high school, Williams attended Dodge City Community College, where he stayed until 2011. As a freshman, he averaged 10 points, 7.2 rebounds and 1.2 steals per game which featured a 22 points and 10 rebound performance against Garden City Community College. For the next 3 seasons he would attend Chicago State University. As a sophomore, he would have games that featured a 21 points and five rebounds performance against North Carolina A&T, a 15 points and five rebound game against DePaul, and a 19 points and 11 rebounds game vs. Houston Baptist. During his junior year, he would have a 11-point game against Notre Dame. His team would go on to win the great west conference tournament that year.  During his senior season, he went on to earn All-WAC Academic Honors.

Professional career 
After going undrafted in the 2015 NBA draft, Williams joined the St. Louis Riversharks of the Midwest Professional Basketball Association in 2016. The following season, he was selected as the #1 overall draft pick of the National Basketball League of Canada in 2017 by the St. John's Edge.

The next year, Williams joined Goga Basket of the Albanian Basketball League in 2018. While there, he helped lead his team to the Albanian Cup Finals. That same season, he also played for Sagesse SC of the Lebanese Basketball League.

Williams again signed with Goga Basket in 2019 but soon signed with 4th Quarter Helsingborg in Sweden. While there he went on to average 27.4 points, 10.4 rebounds, 2.4 assists, and 3.0 steals per game. He finished the 2019–2020 season with  Djurgårdens of the Swedish Basketball League. On March 10, 2020, Williams set his career high in points in a Sweden - Basketligan game where he scored 22 points against Norrköping Dolphins. On February 27, 2021, Williams signed with Cherkaski Mavpy of the Ukrainian Basketball SuperLeague.

Personal life 
In 2014, Aaron and his mother Tonya gained national attention for earning their bachelor's degree from Chicago State University alongside each other.

References

External links 
Chicago State Cogars bio

1991 births
Living people
American expatriate sportspeople in Albania
American expatriate basketball people in Canada
American expatriate basketball people in Lebanon
American expatriate basketball people in Sweden
American men's basketball players
Basketball players from Chicago
Chicago State Cougars men's basketball players
Junior college men's basketball players in the United States
Sagesse SC basketball players
St. John's Edge players
Djurgårdens IF Basket players